Mettupalayam may refer to:

 Mettupalayam, Coimbatore, Tamil Nadu, India
 Mettupalayam railway station
 Mettupalayam, Tiruchirappalli district, Tamil Nadu, India.